Applicability may refer to:

Direct applicability, concept of European Union constitutional law that regulations require no implementing legislation within individual member states
Industrial applicability, a patentability requirement according to which a patent can only be granted for an invention which is susceptible of industrial application
Applicability, element of the Code scaling, applicability, and uncertainty approach used to identify and quantify overall nuclear reactor uncertainties

See also
Applicability domain
Acceptability